97.3 T Radio  is an FM station owned and operated by ELT ADZ and Communication Services. The station's studio is located at Brgy. Poblacion I, Pigcawayan.

ELT ADZ and Communication Services

References

Radio stations in Cotabato
Radio stations established in 2016